Blastobasis abollae is a moth in the  family Blastobasidae. It is found in Costa Rica.

The length of the forewings is about 6.8 mm. The forewings are pale brown intermixed with a few brown scales. The hindwings are pale brown.

Etymology
The specific name is derived from Latin abolla (meaning a thick cloak).

References

Moths described in 2013
Blastobasis
Moths of Central America